Ocean Drive are a dance music project established in 2008 and made up of French music producers Nicolas Carel and Just Uman. A successful European electronic dance and pop act with an album With the Sunshine and a number of singles in France, Belgium and Switzerland, they collaborate with vocalist Gilles Luka, formerly a member of bands Galleon and Luka, and with DJ Oriska, Smartzee and more recently with Norwegian singer / entertainer of Iranian origin Aylar Lie. Carel and Uman launched the band after meeting at a nightclub in Miami, Florida and the music project is named  after the fashionable Ocean Drive in South Beach, Miami, Florida.

In May 2010, Ocean Drive signed a record deal with British electronic label Dance Nation for launching their materials in Britain as well. The remake of "Some People" featuring Aylar was the debut single on the new label in Britain.

Discography

Albums

Singles

References

External links
Ocean Drive MySpace page

Musical groups established in 2008
French electronic music groups